Hillwood Airways (formerly ATX Air Services) is an American charter airline headquartered in Fort Worth, Texas and based at Fort Worth Alliance Airport. It is a subsidiary of The Perot Group, which is controlled by Ross Perot, Jr.

The airline was initially founded in 2013 as ATX Air Services and operated under a Federal Aviation Administration (FAA) Part 125 certificate, limiting the airline to only flying under long-term agreements with few clients.

ATX Air Services rebranded as Hillwood Airways in 2016, received its FAA Part 121 Air Carrier Certification on July 24, 2017, and subsequently started charter operations.

The airline commenced operations with a single Boeing 737-700C BBJ and currently offers it for charter in four configurations: 36 first class seats with two conference tables, 60 first class seats, 90 premium economy seats or as a full freighter. It is one of only few Boeing 737 BBJs fitted with a full-size main-deck cargo door.

Between 2019 and 2021 the airline took delivery of three regular Boeing 737-700s that were originally delivered to Airtran Airways and ConocoPhillips Alaska. The three regulars 737-700s are available for charter in all-passenger configurations ranging from 60 first class to 100 premium economy seats.

One of the airline's Boeing 737-700s was involved in the 2021 Kabul airlift.

Fleet

The Hillwood Airways fleet includes the following aircraft (as of January 13, 2022):

References

Airlines established in 2017
Airlines based in Texas
Charter airlines of the United States